Cupar railway station is a railway station that serves the town of Cupar in Fife, Scotland. The station has two platforms, of which the southbound one (for trains to Edinburgh) is now wheelchair accessible. Services are provided by ScotRail.

History
The station was opened by the Edinburgh and Northern Railway in 1847 as the temporary northern terminus of the Tayport branch of their route along the Fife Coast.  The line northwards to Tayport (for the ferry link to Dundee) was completed in 1850 and through running to Dundee over the first Tay Bridge began in 1878.

Accidents and incidents
On 23 October 1899, an express passenger train was in collision with a cattle train. One person was killed.
On 4 July 1988 a Class 47 cement train derailed, demolishing a section of the bridge which carries the B940 over the railway. This was caused by excessive speed and a  fault with the rail line.

Services 
Weekday timetable

1 tph to  via .

Sunday services operate every two hours each way to Edinburgh & Dundee, with some extra evening trains.

References

Railway stations in Fife
Former North British Railway stations
Railway stations in Great Britain opened in 1847
Railway stations served by ScotRail
Cupar
1847 establishments in Scotland
Listed railway stations in Scotland
Category B listed buildings in Fife